Chimney Park is a  public park in Portland, Oregon's St. Johns neighborhood, in the United States. The park was acquired in 1932; formerly the site of a city incinerator, the park was named after the incinerator's chimney.

References

1932 establishments in Oregon
Parks in Portland, Oregon
Protected areas established in 1932
St. Johns, Portland, Oregon